Edwyn is a given name. Notable people with the name include:

Edwyn Alexander-Sinclair, GCB, MVO (1865–1945), British Royal Navy officer
Edwyn ap Gwriad, Welsh king of Gwent from 1015 to 1045
Edwyn Bevan OBE (1870–1943), versatile English philosopher and historian of the Hellenistic world
Edwyn Burnaby (1798–1867) (1798–1867), English landowner, of Baggrave Hall, Leicestershire
Edwyn Collins (born 1959), Ivor Novello Award-winning Scottish musician, playing mostly electric guitar-driven pop
Edwyn Gray, British author who specialises in naval writing
Edwyn E. Mason (1913–2003), New York politician
Edwyn Owen (1936–2007), American star hockey player at Harvard
Edwyn Scudamore-Stanhope, 10th Earl of Chesterfield, KG, GCVO. PC (1854–1933), British peer and courtier
Edwyn Sherard Burnaby (1830–1883), major-general and Conservative Party Member of Parliament
Sir Edwyn Hoskyns, 12th Baronet (1851–1925), Bishop in the Church of England
Sir Edwyn Hoskyns, 13th Baronet (1884–1937), priest of the Church of England, theologian

fr:Edwyn